The Truyền kỳ mạn lục (傳奇漫錄, "Casual Records of Transmitted Strange Tales") is a 16th-century  Vietnamese historical text, in part a collection of legends, by Nguyễn Dữ (阮餘) composed in Chữ Hán. The collection was translated into French by UNESCO in 1962.

Components 
Truyền kì mạn lục contains 20 stories, tales and records in 4 volumes, each contains 5 works:

Volume 1
 The Record at Xiang King's Temple
 The Story of the Virtuous Wife in Khoái Châu
 The Story of the Cotton Tree
 The Tale of the Tea Boy Reincarnated
 The Record of the Strange Encounter in the Western Camp

Volume 2
 The Tale of the Lawsuit in Dragon Court
 The Record of the Wrongdoing of Đào Thị
 The Tale of the Judge of Tản Viên Temple
 The Tale of Từ Thức Marrying a Goddess
 The Tale of Phạm Tử Hư Visiting Heaven

Volume 3
 The Tale of the Demon in Xương Giang
 The Tale of the Conversation with a Woodcutter at Na Mountain
 The Tale of the Abandoned Pagoda in Đông Triều
 The Story of Thúy Tiêu
 The Record of the Night Party in Đà Giang

Volume 4
 The Story of the Woman in Nam Xương
 The Story of Lý General
 The Story of Lệ Nương
 The Record of the Poetry Talk in Kim Hoa
 The Tale of the Yaksha General

References

External links

Vietnamese history texts
Lê dynasty texts
Vietnamese short story collections
Chinese-language literature of Vietnam